John Browne (c1569-1639) was an English brewer and politician who sat in the House of Commons  between 1614 and 1629.

Life 
Browne was the eldest son of John Browne (d. 1593), an alderman and Mercer of Gloucester and his wife Hester. After his father's death his mother married Godfrey Goldsborough, the bishop of Gloucester. He became a brewer in the city and he was sheriff of Gloucester in 1603 and Mayor for 1610–11. In 1614, he was elected Member of Parliament for Gloucester. He was mayor of Gloucester again for 1621–22 and was re-elected MP for Gloucester in the same year. He was re-elected MP for Gloucester in 1624, 1625, 1626 and 1628. In 1629 he criticized the king's attempt to collect tonnage and poundage without parliamentary consent. He was mayor again for 1634–35.

He settled in Churcham and was described as lord of the manor when he died. He also leased the rectory of Churcham from the Dean and Chapter of Gloucester in 1634.  He died in August 1639 and was buried at Churcham.

Family 
He married twice. His first wife was Eleanor(c1580-1603), the daughter of Robert Robinson of Gloucester. His brother-in-law Anthony Robinson served alongside him in parliament in 1621 and 1624. His second wife was Sarah (d. 1643), the daughter of John Mayo of Charfield and widow of Lawrence Wilshire of Gloucester. He had no children and his estate passed to his second wife, apart from property inherited from his father that passed to two surviving brothers.

References

Year of birth missing
1638 deaths
English brewers
Mayors of Gloucester
Members of the Parliament of England (pre-1707) for Gloucester
English MPs 1614
English MPs 1621–1622
English MPs 1624–1625
English MPs 1625
English MPs 1626
English MPs 1628–1629